Talismaani is the twelfth EP by the black metal band Horna. It was released on Static Supernova Records in 2004 and was limited to 666 copies on picture 7" vinyl.

Track listing
Ars Laternarum - 4:24
Drape Of Shadows - 2:30  
Talismaani - 7:37

Personnel

Additional personnel
 Christophe Szpajdel - logo

External links
Metal Archives
Official Horna Site

2004 EPs
Horna EPs